Brachyscome basaltica, commonly known as swamp daisy, is a  perennial herb in the family Asteraceae and is endemic to Australia. It has mostly white  daisy-like flowers and a yellow centre.

Description
The leaves are borne either along the aerial stems in clusters at the base of the stems. They are more or less sharply pointed at the apex, margins smooth, sometimes with a wavy appearance. The bracts soft, dry edges and the outer surface smooth or with a few glandular hairs.

Taxonomy 
Brachyscome basaltica was first formally described by Ferdinand von Mueller in 1858 and the description was published in Fragmenta Phytographiae Australiae.

Distribution and habitat
Swamp daisy  grows in wetter location in New South Wales, Victoria and Queensland.

References

Flora of Queensland
Flora of Victoria (Australia)
Flora of New South Wales
Plants described in 1858
Taxa named by Ferdinand von Mueller